Heinrich Peters was a German sailor who competed in the 1900 Summer Olympics.

Peters was the crew on the German boat Aschenbrödel, which won the gold medal in the second race of 1 – 2 ton class and silver medal in the open class. He also participated in the ½—1 ton class, but his boat Aschenbrödel weighed in at 1.041 tons instead of less than a ton, and he was disqualified.

Further reading

References

External links

German male sailors (sport)
Sailors at the 1900 Summer Olympics – .5 to 1 ton
Sailors at the 1900 Summer Olympics – 1 to 2 ton
Sailors at the 1900 Summer Olympics – Open class
Olympic sailors of Germany
Year of birth missing
Year of death missing
Olympic gold medalists for Germany
Olympic silver medalists for Germany
Olympic medalists in sailing
Place of birth missing
Place of death missing